The Iron Bridge crosses the lower Someş River to the east side of Satu Mare city, linking the residential districts of Gelu and Centru Nou.

See also

References

Truss bridges
Railway bridges in Romania
Bridges in Satu Mare
Steel bridges